Cadaba fruticosa is a species of plant in the family Capparaceae.

It is endemic on Indian Subcontinent: Bangladesh, India, Pakistan, Sri Lanka and Indo-China: Myanmar.

Its habitat includes the dry parts of the Gangetic plain, down through the Vindhya range, to  Deccan thorn scrub forests
South India. It is threatened by habitat loss. It is known from Pakistan and Bangladesh to the Gangetic plains, south to Madhya Pradesh, Maharashtra and Telangana. It is found in Rayalaseema, central and eastern parts of Karnataka and south to Tamil Nadu, west to rainshadow regions around Palakkad and Punalur.

In Tamil Nadu, Cadaba fruticosa is known as '"vizhuthi"(Tamil: விழுதி (viļuti)) and used in Siddha medicine for more than 2000 years. The juice of the leaves is especially used to cure gonorrhoea (Tamil: வெண்மேகம் (věṇmēkam)).

References

External links

fruticosa
Flora of Asia
Endangered plants
Plants described in 1753
Taxa named by Carl Linnaeus